Naomh Abán GAA is a Gaelic football club based in the Gaeltacht village of Baile Bhuirne, County Cork, Ireland. It participates in games of the Muskerry division of the Cork GAA. The club has experienced senior grade football within Cork county for many years. It now participates in the Premier Intermediate grade.

The club has contributed a number of players to the Cork Gaelic football team. These have included Anthony Lynch, Mícheál Cronin, Gerry Lucey, Gerry Lynch, Mick Scannell, Peadar Healy, and Coleman Twomey.
Naomh Abán GAA fields underage boys and girls teams and also has an adult ladies team. The club does not field any hurling teams.

The ladies team won the All-Ireland Intermediate title in 2003 making it the most successful team in the history of Naomh Abán.

In 2021, Tomás ‘Tiktok’ Keane made his debut for the senior team. Despite his doubters, Tomás won the ‘cutest corner back’ award on his debut season. This was heavily disputed by the nation as a whole, as the nation argued the fact that if Kevin O’Donoghue was placed into his favourite roll of corner back, he would’ve swept the award. Riots followed as uproar tore the west-Cork parish of Ballyvourney to shreds. Many debaters still hold this topic to heart, as this theory still splits the nation.

History

The club is centred in the parish of Baile Bhúirne which is located in the valley of the River Sullane. The parish is spread along the N22 national primary road (Macroom-Killarney), on the eastern side of the Cork/Kerry county bounds. There are two football pitches- Páirc Abán and a new one, Páirc Íosagáin between the two parts of the village Ballymakeera. The first pitch was situated on wetlands which were dried and laid out in lawn. Changing rooms and perimeter walls were also constructed. At the official opening on 25 February 1979, the President of the GAA, Con Murphy, dedicated Páirc Abán (St Aban's Park) in memory of Conchúbhar Ó Luasa. Kerry and Cork played in a challenge game to mark the opening. The new park is located near Coláiste Íosagáin where it has undergone major development in 2016 with the development of Áras Abán, which includes a seated stand, changing rooms, medical room, referee room, gymnasium, meeting room & club shop.

The club is situated in a Gaeltacht area. Many of Naomh Abán's players have achieved highly on the county and national stage. Micheál O Scanaill won an  All-Ireland Senior Football Championship medal in 1973, and he and Dónal Óg Ó Liatháin have won Sigerson medals. O Scannail has also won Railway Cup and Munster Championship medals on more than one occasion. Jerry Lynch has a league medal to his name. Many players have won All-Ireland Minor, U21 and Vocational schools medals. Father and son Diarmuid and Jonathan McCarthy both won All Ireland minor and junior medals. Anthony Lynch was a member of the Cork panel when they won the All-Ireland Senior Football Championship in 2010.

Honours
 Cork Intermediate Football Championship: (2) 1977, 1999; Runners Up: 1975, 1976
 Cork Division 4 Football League: (1) 2021
 Cork Junior Football Championship: (2) 1973, 1988
 Cork Minor B Football Championship: (1) 1992, 2018, 2019
 Cork Under-21 Football Championship: Runners Up 1995
 Cork Intermediate Football League: (3) 1974, 1976, 1978
 Mid Cork Junior A Football Championship: (6) 1928, 1967, 1970, 1971, 1973, 1988
 Mid Cork Junior B Football Championship: (3) 1971, 1995 , 2014, 2018
 Muskerry Junior C Football Championship: (3) 1996, 2007, 2009
 Comórtas Peile na Gaeltachta: (8) 1975, 1979, 1980, 1981, 1982, 2000, 2003, 2005 
 Muskerry Under 21 football Championships: (11) 1965, 1966, 1967, 1968, 1969, 1973, 1976, 1980, 1987, 1995, 2012, 2020
 Muskerry Minor Football Championships: (9) 1965, 1966, 1967, 1981, 1992, 1993, 1996, 1997, 2010
 Rebel Óg West Minor B Football Championship: (3) 2012, 2014, 2018, 2019
 Rebel Óg West Minor B Football League: 2018
 Rebel Óg County Minor B Football Championship: (3) 2012, 2014, 2018, 2019

Notable players
 Michael Creedon
 Peadar Healy
 Anthony Lynch
 Jerry Lucey
 Diarmuid McCarthy
 Michael O'Cronin
 Mick Scannell
 Jerry McSweeny
 Mario O'Riordain

References

External sources
 Naomh Abán GAA at sportsmanager.ie

Gaelic football clubs in County Cork
Gaelic games clubs in County Cork